The Bagby Hot Springs are natural hot springs located in the Mount Hood National Forest about  southeast of Portland, Oregon, United States and about  east of Salem, Oregon.  The springs are within the Cascade Mountains in a heavily forested area at elevation 2280 ft (695 m).  The springs are just outside the boundary of Bull of the Woods Wilderness area.

History 
Bagby Hot Springs were used by Native Americans for hundreds of years.  The springs are named after Bob Bagby, a prospector and hunter who found the site in 1880.

The United States Forest Service built a small guard station next to the hot springs in 1913.  The Bagby Guard Station was used to house Forest Service fire patrol crews during summer fire season.  In 1974, the Forest Service built a new guard station.  The original cabin was closed but was left standing.  In 2006, the original guard cabin was renovated.  Today, it is listed on the National Register of Historic Places, but it is not open to the public.

A bathhouse was constructed at the hot springs in the 1920s.  The original bathhouse burned down in 1979 when bathers left candles unattended in the old wooden structure.  The volunteer group Friends of Bagby (FOB) formed in 1981 to rebuild the bathhouses. Between 1983 and 1986, the Forest Service and FOB joined forces to build three new bathhouses at Bagby.  A conflict among the leadership of FOB led to a rift within the group in the late 1990s, and the Forest Service terminated its contract with the group in summer 2001. In 2011/2012 Bagby was handed over to a concessionaire to run/operate hence the $5 per person soaking fee. 

The bathing facilities at Bagby Hot Springs continue to be popular to this day.

Hot springs 
There are three major springs and several minor outlets that make up Bagby Hot Springs.  The largest spring flows 24 gallons (91 liters) per minute at 138 degrees Fahrenheit (59 degrees Celsius).  The two secondary springs produce 15 gallons (57 liters) per minute at 136 °F (58 °C) and 3 gallons (11 liters) per minute at 120 °F (49 °C). Water from the Bagby springs is rich with minerals.  Chemical analysis of the water shows the following elements are present:  silica 80 parts per million, sodium 51 parts per million, sulfate 45 parts per million, carbonate 36 parts per million, chloride 13 parts per million, calcium 3.4 parts per million, hydroxide 1 parts per million, potassium 1 parts per million, fluoride 0.8 parts per million, magnesium 0.1 parts per million, arsenic 0.01 parts per million, lithium 0.026 parts per million, strontium 0.014 parts per million, and nickel 0.004 parts per million.

Facilities
Bagby Hot Springs are open 8AM to 10PM daily with a $5 per person fee to soak. Visitors can buy a bracelet with cash in the parking lot or pay with cash or credit/debit card in the store at the Ripplebrook Ranger Station.  Camping is not permitted at the hot springs or along the trail to Bagby.  Also, alcohol is prohibited at the site. Nudity is only allowed in the private baths, but not in the open areas around the bathhouses. Local law enforcement officers periodically visit Bagby to ensure a positive atmosphere at the springs.  The waiting time for a soaking tub varies depending upon the number of people visiting the hot springs at any given time. Summer weekends and holidays can be quite busy.

There are three bath houses at the site. The main bathhouse has five cedar log tubs each in a private room. The lower bathhouse has three small 2 person Japaneses style yellow pine soaking tubs and a large round tub located on an open deck. It has one large round tub on an open deck.

Access 
There is no road to Bagby Hot Springs so visitors must hike a  trail from a Forest Service parking area to get to the site.  It is a relatively easy hike with only a  gain in elevation along the way.  The trail is maintained by the Forest Service and volunteers from the Northwest Forest Conservancy.

See also 
 Breitenbush Hot Springs, hot springs and resort not far from Bagby
 Old Joy, a 2006 road movie, wherein the final destination is Bagby Hot Springs

References

External links 

Bagby Hot Springs from Northwest Forest Conservancy
Bagby Current Conditions from Mt. Hood National Forest, Clackamas River Ranger District

Hot springs of Oregon
Bodies of water of Clackamas County, Oregon
Mount Hood National Forest